Bernt Malion (born 15 August 1957) is a Swedish basketball player. He competed in the men's tournament at the 1980 Summer Olympics.

References

1957 births
Living people
Swedish men's basketball players
Olympic basketball players of Sweden
Basketball players at the 1980 Summer Olympics
Sportspeople from Stockholm